William Fleming may refer to:

William Fleming (MP) (c. 1475–1540), MP for Oxford
William Fleming (governor) (1729–1795), soldier and physician who briefly served as governor of Virginia
William Fleming High School in Virginia, named after Governor Fleming
William Fleming (judge) (1736–1824), Virginia jurist, delegate to the Continental Congress
William Bennett Fleming (1803–1886), U.S. Representative from Georgia
William Henry Fleming (1856–1944), American politician and lawyer from Georgia
William Fleming (lifeboatman) (1865–1954), Norfolk lifeboat coxswain
William Fleming (Australian politician) (1874–1961)
William Fleming (Wisconsin politician) (1851–1933), Wisconsin State Assemblyman
Launcelot Fleming (William Launcelot Scott Fleming, 1906–1990), Anglican bishop
William Fleming (Irish republican) (1965–1984), IRA member
William Fleming (priest) (1710–1743), Archdeacon of Carlisle
Bill Fleming (1913–2006), baseball pitcher
Willie Fleming (footballer, born 1901) (fl. 1920s), Scottish footballer
Willie Fleming (born 1939), Canadian football player
Billy Fleming (1871–after 1896), Scottish footballer

See also 
Bill Flemming (1926–2007), sports journalist
Billy Fleming (born 1984), landscape architect and activist